Axiocerses kiellandi is a butterfly in the family Lycaenidae. It is found in south-central Tanzania. The habitat consists of forests at altitudes between 350 and 500 meters.

Adults have been recorded in June.

References

Butterflies described in 1996
Axiocerses
Endemic fauna of Tanzania
Butterflies of Africa